The Battle of Mariupol may refer to:

Battle of Mariupol (1919), between Soviet Ukraine and the volunteer army of the Russian White Movement 
Battle of Mariupol (2014), between Ukraine and the Donetsk People's Republic
Offensive on Mariupol (September 2014), between Donetsk People's Republic and Ukraine
Siege of Mariupol (2022), between Ukraine and Russia
Mariupol hospital airstrike
Mariupol theatre airstrike

See also
 January 2015 Mariupol rocket attack, artillery barrage by Donetsk People's Republic